Harlange is a small town in the commune of Lac de la Haute-Sûre, in north-western Luxembourg.  , the town has a population of 358.

Harlange was a commune in the canton of Wiltz until 1 January 1979, when it was merged with the commune of Mecher to form the new commune of Lac de la Haute-Sûre.  The law creating Lac de la Haute-Sûre was passed on 23 December 1978.

Former commune
The former commune consisted of the villages:

 Harlange
 Tarchamps
 Watrange
 Schumannseck (lieu-dit)

References

Former communes of Luxembourg
Lac de la Haute-Sûre
Towns in Luxembourg